Darwin Asahel Finney (August 11, 1814 – August 25, 1868) was a Republican member of the U.S. House of Representatives from Pennsylvania.

Early life

Darwin Asahel Finney was born in Shrewsbury, Vermont.  He attended the public schools and was graduated from the military academy at Rutland, Vermont.  He moved with his parents to Meadville, Pennsylvania.  He served in a clerk in a law office in Kingsbury, New York, in 1834 and 1835.  He graduated from Allegheny College in Meadville in 1840.  He studied law, was admitted to the bar in 1842 and commenced practice in Meadville.

Public service

He was a member of the Pennsylvania State Senate from 1856 to 1861.

Finnery was elected as a Republican to the Fortieth Congress and served until his death at Brussels, Belgium, in 1868.  Interment in Greendale Cemetery in Meadville, Pennsylvania.  Cenotaph at Congressional Cemetery in Washington, D.C.

See also
List of United States Congress members who died in office (1790–1899)

Sources
 Retrieved on 2009-5-15
The Political Graveyard

Republican Party Pennsylvania state senators
Pennsylvania lawyers
1814 births
1868 deaths
Burials at the Congressional Cemetery
Republican Party members of the United States House of Representatives from Pennsylvania
People from Shrewsbury, Vermont
People from Meadville, Pennsylvania
People from Kingsbury, New York
19th-century American politicians
Burials at Greendale Cemetery
19th-century American lawyers